Samy is a Tamil film director and a script writer. Several of his films have been criticised for depicting controversial content on screen.

Career
Samy started his career assisting directors such as Balu Mahendra and S. A. Chandrasekaran, and worked as a dialogue writer for Sarathkumar starrer Dosth (2001). He made his directorial debut with Uyir (2006), which revolved around a woman who falls in love with her brother-in-law after the demise of her husband. The film became controversial upon release due to its bold content but did well at box office. His second film Mirugam (2007) which dealt with a cruel villager who is suffering from HIV was met with a controversy after Samy assaulted the actress Padmapriya by slapping her in front of the crew and the village people. The South Indian Film Industry imposed a one-year ban on him for his behaviour on set, but later the ban was reduced to six months due to constant lobbying by the producers' associations.

In 2008, Samy began working on a project titled Sarithram starring Rajkiran and Aadhi which was said to be dealing with the subject of Silambam; however despite launch the project was shelved. He then made his comeback with Sindhu Samaveli (2010) with entirely new cast. Like his previous ventures this film too attracted controversy because of its content. Upon release, the film met with contrasting reviews, whilst some critics refused to give the film a rating, declaring their disgust at the film's plot. The film released on 3 September 2010 and did poorly at the box office. His next film Kangaroo (2015) would be dedicated to caring mothers and stated that it was a family friendly film, marking a change from the controversial themes of his previous three projects. The film had a low key release and went unnoticed. Director Saamy lashed out at actor Vijay and was beaten black and blue by his fans. In 2019, it was announced that Samy would direct Akka Kuruvi, an official remake of the 1997 Iranian film Children of Heaven.

Filmography

References 

Indian film directors
Tamil film directors
Living people
21st-century Indian film directors
Year of birth missing (living people)